Gabriel Peres (born 5 March 1997) is a Brazilian professional footballer who plays as a Defender for Malaysia Super League club Sabah F.C..

Early life

Peres was born in Pelotas.

Career

Before playing for CRAC, Peres played for Concordia.

Before the 2023 season, he signed for Sabah F.C..

References

1997 births
Living people